The women's 800 metres at the 2016 IPC Athletics European Championships was held at the Stadio Olimpico Carlo Zecchini in Grosseto from 11 to 16 June. Due to a lack of competitors, the T34 was declared a non-medal event.

Medalists

 This race was a non medal event.

See also
List of IPC world records in athletics

References

800 metres
2016 in women's athletics
800 metres at the World Para Athletics European Championships